Panipat City Assembly constituency is one of the 90 constituencies in the Haryana Legislative Assembly of Haryana a north state of India. Panipat City is also part of Karnal Lok Sabha constituency.

Members of Legislative Assembly

See also

 Panipat
 Panipat district
 List of constituencies of Haryana Legislative Assembly

References

Assembly constituencies of Haryana
Panipat